Giovanni Caro (born 14 November 1983) is a Mexican professional boxer of Russian descent.

Professional career 
Giovanni's won the WBC FECARBOX Super Bantamweight title against veteran Breilor Terán of Venezuela.

IBF Super Bantamweight Championship 
On 29 October 2011 Caro lost a controversial IBF Super Bantamweight championship against Takalani Ndlovu.

References

External links 
 

Super-bantamweight boxers
Boxers from Mexico City
Mexican people of Russian descent
1987 births
Living people
Mexican male boxers